Hidden Hills is a city and gated community in the Santa Monica Mountains region of Los Angeles County, California. It is located next to the city of Calabasas. It is notable for being home to many actors and celebrities. The population was 1,725 at the 2020 census.

History
The community was designed and developed in the 1950s by A. E. Hanson, a Southern California landscape architect and planned community developer. His earlier projects included Rolling Hills and Palos Verdes Estates, and the 1920s Beverly Hills Harold Lloyd Estate "Greenacres".

Vanity Fair described the city as follows:

Geography

Hidden Hills is in the southern Simi Hills Transverse range near the Santa Monica Mountains on the western edge of San Fernando Valley, near the border with neighboring Ventura County.

Hidden Hills is bordered on the north by the nature reserve and greenbelt of the Upper Las Virgenes Canyon Open Space Preserve, a park with miles of equestrian, hiking, and mountain biking trails. Nearby to the south, is the pioneer Leonis Adobe National Historic Landmark, with gardens and a historical museum. It's across El Camino Real of the Spanish Las Californias and Mexican Alta California eras, now U.S. Route 101, also called the Ventura Freeway in that area south of Hidden Hills.

Climate

Arts and culture
The city has a summer camp for children, community and children's theatre programs, annual parades, carnivals, parties, welcome wagon, snow days, and weekly community-wide barbecues during the summer.

Government

In the United States House of Representatives, Hidden Hills is located within .

Hidden Hills has traditionally been won by Republican candidates for public office. However, the 2016 United States presidential election represented a substantial swing toward the Democratic Party in Hidden Hills, with Hillary Clinton carrying the town.

In California's 2006 gubernatorial election, incumbent Republican Governor Arnold Schwarzenegger received more than 72% of votes cast, while his Democratic opponent, Phil Angelides, received approximately 25%.

In the 2012 United States presidential election, the Republican candidate, Governor Mitt Romney of Massachusetts received 54.5% of votes cast, compared to the incumbent Democratic President Barack Obama who received 44.4% of votes cast.

Education
The one public school in Hidden Hills, Round Meadow Elementary, scored 902 in the 2013 Academic Performance Index.

Infrastructure
The Los Angeles County Sheriff's Department (LASD) operates the Malibu/Lost Hills Station in Calabasas, serving Hidden Hills.

The Los Angeles County Fire Department (LACoFD) handles fire service calls for Hidden Hills.

Notable people

Pepe Aguilar, singer, actor, and producer
Marc Anthony, singer
Frankie Avalon, musician
Iggy Azalea, rapper
Edgar Buchanan, actor
Tyson Chandler, professional basketball player
Eddie Cibrian, actor
Kaley Cuoco, actress
Miley Cyrus, singer-songwriter
DeMar DeRozan, basketball player
Scott Disick, television personality
Drake, rapper
Don Drysdale (1936–1993), Los Angeles Dodgers pitcher
Jeff Dunham, comedian and ventriloquist
Kevin Durant, NBA player for the Brooklyn Nets
Elliot Easton, musician (The Cars)
Melissa Etheridge, musician
Scott Foley, actor
Jamie Foxx, actor
Daisy Fuentes, TV personality and host
Paul George, professional basketball player
Jared Goff, NFL quarterback
Selena Gomez, actress, singer
Taylor Hawkins (1972-2022), drummer for Foo Fighters
Robert Herjavec, businessman
Olivia Jade, youtuber
Caitlyn Jenner, Olympic athlete
Kendall Jenner, model, television personality
Kris Jenner, television personality
Khloé Kardashian, television personality
Kim Kardashian, television personality
Rob Kardashian, television personality
Chuck Liddell, martial artist
Diana Jenkins, entrepreneur and philanthropist 
Lori Loughlin, actress
Leona Lewis, singer-songwriter and activist 
Jennifer Lopez, singer, actress, and entrepreneur
 Madonna, singer/actress
Howie Mandel,  comedian, TV host
Richard Marx, singer-songwriter, producer
Marie McDonald, actress, singer
Nicki Minaj, rapper
French Montana, rapper
Shay Mitchell, actress
Ozzy Osbourne, musician
Sharon Osbourne, television personality, host
Russell Peters, comedian
Trevor Plouffe, Major League Baseball (MLB) player
Jeff Porcaro, musician
Jalen Ramsey, football player
Denise Richards, actress and model
LeAnn Rimes, singer-songwriter, and producer
Josh Satin, major league baseball player
Vin Scully (1927–2022), sportscaster
Nicolette Sheridan, actress
Shroud, online streamer
Ben Simmons, basketball player
Jessica Simpson, singer
Sinbad, stand-up comedian, actor
Will Smith, rapper, actor
Jada Pinkett-Smith, actress, singer
Jaden Smith, rapper, singer, songwriter, actor
Britney Spears, pop singer, in a home formerly owned by construction magnate Ronald Tutor
Matthew Stafford, NFL player
John Stamos, actor and musician
Jeffree Starr, makeup artist
Gabrielle Union, actress
Alex Van Halen, musician
Dwyane Wade, basketball player
The Weeknd, musician
Kanye West, rapper and producer
Lil Wayne, rapper

In popular culture
The city was the setting of a short-lived NBC sitcom Hidden Hills, which aired in 2002–2003.

See also

 List of municipalities in California

References

External links

 
Cities in Los Angeles County, California
Communities in the San Fernando Valley
Simi Hills
Gated communities in California
Incorporated cities and towns in California
Populated places established in 1961
1961 establishments in California